As of September 2009, there are 348 Registered Respiratory Therapist (RRT) Programs currently accredited by the COARC.

United States

Alabama
University of Alabama at Birmingham
University of South Alabama - Mobile
Wallace Community College - Dothan
Wallace State College - Hanceville

Arizona
Apollo College-Mesa
GateWay Community College - Phoenix
Kaplan College-Phoenix
Pima Community College-Tucson
Pima Medical Institute-Mesa
Pima Medical Institute-Tucson

Arkansas
Northwest Arkansas Community College - Bentonville
Pulaski Technical College - North Little Rock
Southeast Arkansas College - Pine Bluff
University of Arkansas for Medical Sciences-Little Rock
University of Arkansas for Medical Sciences-Texarkana

California
American Career College - Anaheim
American Career College - Ontario
American River College - Sacramento
Butte College - Oroville
California College San Diego 
Carrington College California - Pleasant Hill
Concorde Career College-Garden Grove
Concorde Career College-North Hollywood
Concorde Career College-San Bernardino
Crafton Hills College - Yucaipa
East Los Angeles College - Monterey Park
Foothill College - Los Altos Hills
Fresno City College - Fresno
Grossmont College - El Cajon
Kaplan College-Salida
Loma Linda University - Loma Linda
Los Angeles Valley College - Valley Glen
Modesto Junior College - Modesto
Mount San Antonio College - Walnut
Napa Valley College - Napa
Ohlone College - Fremont
Orange Coast College - Costa Mesa
Pima Medical Institute-Chula Vista
San Joaquin Valley College-Rancho Cucamonga
San Joaquin Valley College-Bakersfield
San Joaquin Valley College-Rancho Cordova
San Joaquin Valley College-Visalia
Skyline College - San Bruno
Victor Valley College - Victorville

Colorado
Pickens Technical College - Aurora
Pima Medical Institute-Denver
Pueblo Community College - Pueblo

Connecticut
Goodwin College - East Hartford 
Manchester Community College - Manchester
Naugatuck Valley Community College - Waterbury
Norwalk Hospital/Norwalk Community Technical College - Norwalk
Quinnipiac University - Hamden
University of Hartford - West Hartford

Delaware
Delaware Technical & Community College - Jack F. Owens Campus - Georgetown
Delaware Technical & Community College - Wilmington

District of Columbia
University of the District of Columbia - Washington, D.C.

Florida
ATI Health Education Centers - Miami
Broward College - Coconut Creek
Daytona State College - Daytona Beach
Edison State College - Fort Myers
Florida A&M University - Tallahassee
Florida State College at Jacksonville - Jacksonville
Gulf Coast Community College - Panama City
Hillsborough Community College - Tampa
Indian River State College - Fort Pierce
Miami Dade College - Miami
Palm Beach Community College - Palm Beach Gardens 
Santa Fe College - Gainesville
Seminole State College of Florida - Altamonte Springs
St. Petersburg College - Pinellas Park
Tallahassee Community College - Tallahassee
University of Central Florida - Orlando
Valencia Community College - Orlando

Georgia
Armstrong Atlantic State University - Savannah
Augusta Technical College - Augusta
Darton State College - Albany
Georgia Northwestern Technical College - Rome
Georgia State University - Atlanta
Gwinnett Technical College - Lawrenceville
Heart of Georgia Technical College - Dublin
Macon State College - Macon
Medical College of Georgia - Augusta
Okefenokee Technical College - Waycross
Southern Crescent Technical College - Griffin
Southwest Georgia Technical College - Thomasville

Hawaii
Kapiolani Community College - Honolulu

Idaho
Boise State University - Boise
Idaho State University - Pocatello

Illinois
College of DuPage - Glen Ellyn
Illinois Central College - Peoria
Kankakee Community College - Kankakee
Kaskaskia College - Centralia
Malcolm X College - Chicago
Moraine Valley Community College - Palos Hills
Olive-Harvey College - Chicago
Parkland College - Champaign
Rock Valley College - Rockford
Southwestern Illinois College - Belleville
St. John's Hospital - Springfield
Triton College - River Grove

Indiana
Clarian Health Partners - Indianapolis
Indiana University Northwest - Gary
Ivy Tech Community College, Central Indiana Region - Indianapolis
Ivy Tech Community College - Fort Wayne
Ivy Tech Community College - Lafayette
Ivy Tech Community College-Northwest Region - Gary
Ivy Tech Community College - Sellersburg
Ivy Tech Community College - Terre Haute
University of Southern Indiana - Evansville

Iowa
Des Moines Area Community College - Ankeny
Kirkwood Community College - Cedar Rapids
Northeast Iowa Community College - Peosta
Southeastern Community College - West Burlington
St. Luke's College - Sioux City

Kansas
Johnson County Community College - Overland Park
Kansas City Kansas Community College - Kansas City 
Labette Community College - Parsons
Newman University - Wichita
Seward County Community College - Liberal
University of Kansas Medical Center - Kansas City
Washburn University - Topeka

Kentucky
Bellarmine University - Louisville
Big Sandy Community and Technical College - Paintsville
Bluegrass Community and Technical College - Lexington
Jefferson Community and Technical College - Louisville
Madisonville Community College - Madisonville
Maysville Community and Technical College - Morehead
Northern Kentucky University - Highland Heights
Somerset Community College - Somerset
Southcentral Kentucky Community and Technical College - Bowling Green
Southeast Kentucky Community and Technical College - Pineville
West Kentucky Community and Technical College - Paducah

Louisiana
Bossier Parish Community College - Shreveport
Delgado Community College - New Orleans
Louisiana State University Health Sciences Center - New Orleans
Louisiana State University Health Sciences Center - Shreveport
Nicholls State University - Houma
Our Lady of Holy Cross/Alton Ochsner Medical Foundation - New Orleans
Our Lady of the Lake - Baton Rouge
Southern University at Shreveport - Shreveport

Maine
Kennebec Valley Community College - Fairfield
Southern Maine Community College - South Portland

Maryland
Allegany College of Maryland - Cumberland
Baltimore City Community College - Baltimore
Community College of Baltimore County - Essex 
Frederick Community College - Frederick
Prince George's Community College - Largo
Salisbury University - Salisbury
Washington Adventist University - Takoma Park

Massachusetts
Berkshire Community College - Pittsfield
Massasoit Community College - Brockton
North Shore Community College - Danvers
Northeastern University - Boston
Northern Essex Community College - Lawrence
Quinsigamond Community College - Worcester
Springfield Technical Community College - Springfield

Michigan
Delta College - University Center
Ferris State University - Big Rapids
Henry Ford Community College - Dearborn
Kalamazoo Valley Community College - Kalamazoo
Macomb Community College - Clinton Township
Monroe County Community College - Monroe
Mott Community College - Flint
Muskegon Community College - Muskegon
Oakland Community College - Southfield

Minnesota
Lake Superior College - Duluth
Mayo Clinic, Mayo School of Health Sciences - Rochester
Northland Community & Technical College - East Grand Forks
Saint Paul College - Saint Paul
St. Catherine University - Minneapolis

Mississippi
Copiah-Lincoln Community College - Woodville
Hinds Community College - Jackson
Itawamba Community College - Fulton
Meridian Community College - Meridian
Mississippi Gulf Coast Community College - Gautier Closed
Northeast Mississippi Community College - Booneville
Northwest Mississippi Community College - Southaven
Pearl River Community College - Hattiesburg

Missouri
Cape Girardeau Career and Technology Center - Cape Girardeau 
Concorde Career College - Kansas City
Hannibal Career & Technology Center/Hannibal LaGrange College - Hannibal
Missouri Southern State University - Joplin
Missouri State University - West Plains
Ozarks Technical Community College - Springfield
Rolla Technical Center - Rolla
Sanford-Brown College - Fenton
St. Louis Community College - St. Louis
University of Missouri - Columbia

Montana
Montana State University College of Technology - Great Falls
University of Montana - Missoula

Nebraska
Alegent Health, Midland University, University of Nebraska at Kearney - Omaha
Metropolitan Community College - Omaha
Nebraska Methodist College - Omaha
Southeast Community College - Lincoln

Nevada
College of Southern Nevada - Las Vegas
Pima Medical Institute - Paradise

New Hampshire
River Valley Community College - Claremont

New Jersey
Bergen Community College - Paramus
Brookdale Community College - Lincroft
Northwest New Jersey Consortium Respiratory Care Education - Randolph
University of Medicine and Dentistry of New Jersey-North - Newark
University of Medicine and Dentistry of New Jersey-South - Stratford

New Mexico
Central New Mexico Community College - Albuquerque
Doña Ana Community College - Las Cruces
Eastern New Mexico University - Roswell
Pima Medical Institute - Albuquerque

New York
CUNY Borough of Manhattan Community College - New York City
Erie Community College - North Campus - Williamsville
Genesee Community College - Batavia
Hudson Valley Community College - Troy
Long Island University - Brooklyn
Mohawk Valley Community College - Utica
Molloy College - Rockville Centre
Nassau Community College - Garden City
Onondaga Community College - Syracuse
Stony Brook University - Stony Brook
SUNY Upstate Medical University - Syracuse
Westchester Community College - Valhalla

North Carolina
Carteret Community College - Morehead City
Catawba Valley Community College - Hickory
Central Piedmont Community College - Charlotte
Durham Technical Community College - Durham
Edgecombe Community College - Rocky Mount
Fayetteville Technical Community College - Fayetteville
Forsyth Technical Community College - Winston-Salem
Pitt Community College - Greenville
Robeson Community College - Lumberton
Rockingham Community College - Wentworth
Sandhills Community College - Pinehurst
Southwestern Community College - Sylva
Stanly Community College - Albemarle

North Dakota
North Dakota State University - Fargo
St. Alexius Medical Center / University of Mary - Bismarck

Ohio
Bowling Green State University Firelands College - Huron
Buckeye Hills Career Center - Racine
Cincinnati State Technical and Community College/University of Cincinnati Clermont College - Batavia
Collins Career Center - Chesapeake
Columbus State Community College - Columbus
Cuyahoga Community College - Parma
Eastern Gateway Community College - Steubenville
James A. Rhodes State College - Lima
Kettering College of Medical Arts - Kettering
Lakeland Community College - Kirtland
North Central State College - Mansfield
Ohio State University - Columbus
Shawnee State University - Portsmouth
Sinclair Community College - Dayton
Southern State Community College - Washington Court House
Stark State College of Technology - North Canton
University of Akron - Akron
University of Toledo - Toledo
Washington State Community College - Marietta
Youngstown State University - Youngstown

Oklahoma
Francis Tuttle Vocational Technical Center - Oklahoma City
Northwest Oklahoma Respiratory Care Consortium - Enid
Rose State College - Midwest City
Tulsa Community College - Tulsa
 Platt College, Moore Ok

Oregon
Lane Community College - Eugene
Mt. Hood Community College - Gresham
Oregon Institute of Technology - Klamath Falls

Pennsylvania
CHI Institute - Philadelphia Mills - Philadelphia
Community College of Allegheny County-Allegheny Campus - Pittsburgh
Community College of Philadelphia - Philadelphia
Crozer-Chester Medical Center (Keystone) - Chester
Gannon University - Erie
Gwynedd-Mercy College - Gwynedd Valley
Harrisburg Area Community College - Harrisburg
Indiana University of Pennsylvania - Pittsburgh
Luzerne County Community College - Nanticoke
Mansfield University of Pennsylvania - Sayre
Millersville University of Pennsylvania - Millersville
Reading Area Community College - Reading
Sanford-Brown Institute - Pittsburgh
Thaddeus Stevens College of Technology - Lancaster
University of Pittsburgh - Johnstown
West Chester University of Pennsylvania - West Chester
York College of Pennsylvania - York

Rhode Island
Community College of Rhode Island - Lincoln

South Carolina
Florence-Darlington Technical College - Florence
Greenville Technical College - Greenville
Midlands Technical College - Columbia
Orangeburg-Calhoun Technical College - Orangeburg
Piedmont Technical College - Greenwood
Spartanburg Community College - Spartanburg
Tri-County Technical College - Pendleton
Trident Technical College - Charleston

South Dakota
Dakota State University - Madison

Tennessee
Baptist Memorial College of Health Science - Memphis
Chattanooga State Community College - Chattanooga
Columbia State Community College - Columbia
Concorde Career College - Memphis
East Tennessee State University - Elizabethton
Jackson State Community College - Jackson
Roane State Community College - Harriman
Tennessee State University - Nashville
Volunteer State Community College - Gallatin

Texas
Alvin Community College - Alvin
Amarillo College - Amarillo
Angelina College - Lufkin
Collin College - McKinney
Del Mar College - Corpus Christi
El Centro College - Dallas
El Paso Community College - El Paso
Houston Community College System - Houston
Howard College - San Angelo
Lamar Institute of Technology-Beaumont
Lone Star College - Kingwood
McLennan Community College - Waco
Midland College - Midland
Midwestern State University - Wichita Falls
San Jacinto College-Central - Pasadena
South Plains College - Lubbock
St. Philip's College - San Antonio
Tarrant County College - Hurst
Temple College - Temple
Texas Southern University - Houston
Texas State University - San Marcos
Tyler Junior College - Tyler
University of Texas Health Science Center at San Antonio
University of Texas Medical Branch - Galveston
University of Texas at Brownsville and Texas Southmost College - Brownsville
USAF School of Health Care Sciences / 882 Training Group - Sheppard Air Force Base
Victoria College - Victoria
Weatherford College - Weatherford

Utah
Independence University-California College for Health Sciences - Salt Lake City
Stevens-Henager College - Murray
Weber State University - Ogden

Vermont
Vermont Technical College - Randolph Center

Virginia
Central Virginia Community College - Lynchburg
J. Sargeant Reynolds Community College - Richmond
Jefferson College of Health Sciences - Roanoke
Mountain Empire Community College - Big Stone Gap
Northern Virginia Community College - Springfield
Shenandoah University - Winchester
Southwest Virginia Community College - Richlands
Tidewater Community College - Virginia Beach

Washington
Highline Community College - Des Moines
Seattle Central Community College - Seattle
Spokane Community College - Spokane
Tacoma Community College - Tacoma

West Virginia
Carver Career Center - Charleston
West Virginia Northern Community College - Wheeling
Wheeling Jesuit University - Wheeling

Wisconsin
Chippewa Valley Technical College - Eau Claire
Madison Area Technical College - Madison
Mid-State Technical College - Marshfield
Milwaukee Area Technical College - Milwaukee
Moraine Park Technical College - Fond du Lac
Northeast Wisconsin Technical College - Green Bay
Western Technical College - La Crosse

Wyoming
 none

References

Respiratory therapy
Health-related lists